The  Richmond Revolution season was the team's first season as an indoor football franchise and first in the Indoor Football League (IFL). One of twenty-five teams competing in the IFL for the 2010 season, the Revolution were members of the Atlantic East Division of the United Conference. The team played their home games at Arthur Ashe Athletic Center in Richmond, Virginia.

Schedule

Regular season

Standings

Playoffs

Roster

References

2010 Indoor Football League season
Sports in Richmond, Virginia
2010 in sports in Virginia